Nandighosha TV is a 24-hour Odia news channel of the News World Group. This channel was launched on 13 June 2014 by Odisha Chief Minister Naveen Patnaik in the presence of the Group CEO Niraj Sanan. Focus TV Group runs a number of other news channels in various languages like Hindi and Bengali.

This channel is available in Measat 3 in MPEG-4 format. It provides news along with various other programs related to social, economic and education conditions in Odisha. Headquartered in Bhubaneswar, Focus Odisha has nine bureaus located in Cuttack and Puri, each having a journalist, a video journalist and technical staff. Apart from this, 65 stringers have been employed in various locations of Odisha to cover the entire state, making it a nearly 150 strong team. Nearly Rs 10 crore has been invested into setting up the channel.

References

See also
List of Odia-language television channels

Companies based in Bhubaneswar
Television stations in Bhubaneswar
2014 establishments in Odisha
Television channels and stations established in 2014